Lore is an American horror anthology television series developed by the creator of the podcast of the same name, Aaron Mahnke, with Valhalla Entertainment and Propagate Content. The series airs through Amazon Prime Video and follows the podcast's anthology format with each episode featuring a new story. The show combines documentary footage and cinematic scenes to tell horror stories and their origins, and features Robert Patrick, Holland Roden, and Colm Feore. The series premiered on October 13, 2017.

On February 26, 2018, Amazon renewed the series for a second season. The second season premiered on October 19, 2018. On July 27, 2019 the series was cancelled.

Cast and characters
 Aaron Mahnke as Narrator
 Robert Patrick as Reverend Eliakim Phelps (father of Austin Phelps)
 Holland Roden as Bridget Cleary
 Colm Feore as Dr. Walter Jackson Freeman II
 Kristin Bauer van Straten as Minnie Otto
 Cathal Pendred as Michael Cleary
 Campbell Scott as George Brown
 Adam Goldberg as Peter Stumpp
 John Byner as Patrick Boland
 Sandra Ellis Lafferty as Aunt Bridget
 Nadine Lewington as Johanna Kennedy Burke
 Kristen Cloke as Dr. Marjorie Freeman

Broadcast
Lore debuted on Amazon Prime Video on October 13, 2017.

Reception
Initial critical reception was mixed. As of August 15, 2019, Season 1 had earned an aggregate rating of 68% "fresh" on Rotten Tomatoes, based on 25 critic ratings. Dread Central praised the series awarding it five out of five stars and saying "The only negative I can find is that there aren’t more episodes. It’s just that good." IGN gave it 9.0 and said " It is a wonderful piece of entertainment for horror fans and casual viewers alike to learn more about the monsters we thought we knew so well." Nerdist gave it 4 out of 5 burned heart burritos.

Episodes

Season 1 (2017)

Season 2 (2018)

See also
 List of podcast adaptations

References

External links
 
 

2017 American television series debuts
2018 American television series endings
2010s American horror television series
2010s American mystery television series
2010s American drama television series
English-language television shows
Television shows based on podcasts
Television series by Amazon Studios